The 1990–91 Courage National 4 North was the fourth full season of rugby union within the fourth tier of the English league system, currently known as National League 2 North, and counterpart to the Courage National 4 South (now National League 2 South).  It was the first season for the division using the name National 4 North, having been known as Area League North the previous year.  The league champions were newly promoted Otley who comfortably achieved their second successive promotion, this time to the 1991–92 National Division 3, five points clear of runners up Lichfield.  

For Birmingham & Solihull fans it was a familiar story, as previous incarnations of the club (Solihull and Birmingham) had already been relegated from the division. Both sides would drop to Midlands 1.

Structure

Each team played one match against each of the other teams, playing a total of ten matches each.  The champions are promoted to National Division 3 and the bottom team was relegated to either North 1 or Midlands 1 depending on their locality.

Participating teams and locations

League table

Sponsorship
Division 4 North is part of the Courage Clubs Championship and was sponsored by Courage Brewery.

See also
 National League 2 North

References

N4
National League 2 North